Erwin Franzkowiak (29 November 1894 – 19 March 1984) was a German field hockey player who competed in the 1928 Summer Olympics.

He was a member of the German field hockey team, which won the bronze medal. He played one match as back.

External links
 
Erwin Franzkowiak's profile at databaseOlympics
Erwin Franzkowiak's profile at Sports Reference.com

1894 births
1984 deaths
German male field hockey players
Olympic field hockey players of Germany
Field hockey players at the 1928 Summer Olympics
Olympic bronze medalists for Germany
Olympic medalists in field hockey
Medalists at the 1928 Summer Olympics